The Diocese of Cape Palmas is a Latin Church ecclesiastical territory or diocese of the Catholic Church in Liberia. Its episcopal see is Cape Palmas. The Diocese of Cape Palmas is a suffragan diocese in the ecclesiastical province of the metropolitan Archdiocese of Monrovia.

History
 February 2, 1950: Established as Apostolic Prefecture of Cape Palmas from the Apostolic Vicariate of Liberia
 May 7, 1962: Promoted as Apostolic Vicariate of Cape Palmas
 December 19, 1981: Promoted as Diocese of Cape Palmas

Bishops
Prefect Apostolic of Cape Palmas
 Father Francis Carroll, S.M.A. (1950.10.27 – 1960.12.20), appointed Vicar Apostolic of Monrovia; future Archbishop
 Vicars Apostolic of Cape Palmas
 Bishop Nicholas Grimley, S.M.A. (1962.05.07 – 1972.07.30)
 Bishop Patrick Kla Juwle (1972.07.30 – 1973.08.18)
 Bishop Boniface Nyema Dalieh (1973.12.17 – 1981.12.19); 'see below Bishops of Cape Palmas
 Bishop Boniface Nyema Dalieh (1981.12.19 - 2008.10.15); see above''
 Bishop Andrew J. Karnley (since 2011.04.30)

Other priest of this diocese who became bishop
Benedict Dotu Sekey, appointed Bishop of Gbarnga in 1986

See also
Roman Catholicism in Liberia

Sources
 GCatholic.org
 Catholic Hierarchy

Cape Palmas
Cape Palmas
Cape Palmas
1950 establishments in Liberia